The Big Town is a 1925 American short silent comedy film directed by Robert F. McGowan. It was the 34th Our Gang short subject released.

Plot
The gang is playing around the railroad yard when a fire breaks out. They hide in a railroad car and get trapped. The next morning they find out they have arrived in New York City. They soon are enjoying the sites, visiting the Brooklyn Bridge, the Statue of Liberty, and taking a sightseeing bus for a joyride, where they are finally caught by the police.

A police officer is assigned to take the gang back home on a train. They scatter the entomologist's bugs around the sleeper car during the night, and order exotic foods for breakfast.  They eventually arrive back home where their mothers greet them with a spanking.

Cast

The Gang
 Joe Cobb – Joe
 Jackie Condon – Jackie
 Mickey Daniels – Mickey
 Allen Hoskins – Farina
 Eugene Jackson – Pineapple
 Mary Kornman –  Mary

Additional cast
 David Durand  – kid on train
 Jack Gavin – gang escort
 Gus Leonard  – entomologist
 William Gillespie – passengers
 Helen Gilmore – passenger
 Lyle Tayo – passenger

References

External links

1925 films
1925 comedy films
1925 short films
American black-and-white films
Films directed by Robert F. McGowan
American silent short films
Hal Roach Studios short films
Our Gang films
1920s American films
Silent American comedy films